The battle of Hogland 1705 was a minor naval battle between the Swedish ship of the line Reval and 7 Russian galleys. After several hours of fighting the Swedes were victorious. It was the first time that Russian galleys took part in a naval battle in the Baltic Sea.

Sources
Ehrensvärd, Ulla; Kokkonen, Pellervo; Nurminen, Juha (1995). Mare Balticum : 2000 år av östersjöns historia [2000 years of history of the Baltic Sea] (in Swedish). .

Hogland 1705
Hogland 1705
1705 in Europe
Gulf of Finland
Hogland 1705